Estadio Fausto Flores Lagos is a multi-use stadium in Choluteca, Choluteca, Honduras.  It is currently used mostly for football matches and it was the home stadium for C.D. Broncos until 2001.  The stadium holds 5,500 people.

References

Fausto Flores Lagos, Estadio